John Paul Boychuk (born January 19, 1984) is a Canadian former professional ice hockey defenceman. Drafted 61st overall in 2002 by the Colorado Avalanche, he played for the Avalanche, the Boston Bruins and New York Islanders of the National Hockey League (NHL). In 2011, he was a part of the Bruins' Stanley Cup championship team. He was traded to the Islanders prior to the 2014–15 season, where he would announce retirement after six seasons with the team.

Playing career
As a youth, Boychuk played in the 1997 Quebec International Pee-Wee Hockey Tournament with a minor ice hockey team from Edmonton.

Boychuk was drafted 61st overall in the National Hockey League's (NHL) 2002 Entry Draft by the Colorado Avalanche. Prior to being drafted, he played with the Western Hockey League's (WHL) Calgary Hitmen. Boychuk made his professional debut with the Hershey Bears in the 2004–05 season. Boychuk spent the next four years in the Avalanche organization playing primarily for their American Hockey League (AHL) affiliates. He made his NHL debut in the 2007–08 season on January 5, 2008, against the New York Islanders. Boychuk made his debut as a forward playing on the wing rather than his usual defenceman position.

On June 24, 2008, Boychuk was traded to the Boston Bruins in exchange for Matt Hendricks. He was assigned to their AHL affiliate, the Providence Bruins, to start the 2008–09 season and in his first week was named "AHL Player of the Week." On December 1, 2008, Boychuk was recalled to Boston and made his Bruins debut in a 3–1 victory over the Tampa Bay Lightning on December 4, 2008. Boychuk was then returned to Providence for the rest of the season, where he played a break-out season, capturing the Eddie Shore Award by leading the league with 20 goals and 45 assists among defenceman and being named to the AHL's First All-Star Team.

On July 1, 2009, Boychuk secured his first one-way contract when he re-signed with the Bruins for the 2009–10 season. After initially making the Bruins opening night roster, Boychuk was primarily a healthy scratch in the first months of the season. After returning from a conditioning assignment in Providence, he established himself within the Bruins as a two-way defenceman to finish with 15 points in 51 games to earn a two-year contract extension on June 24, 2010.

He was a member of the Bruins when they defeated the Vancouver Canucks to win the 2011 Stanley Cup Finals.

The following season, Boychuk was rewarded with a three-year contract extension to remain a fixture on the Stanley Cup-winning Bruins blueline. Despite an inability to successfully defend the Stanley Cup, Boychuk produced 15 points in 77 games.

During the 2012–13 NHL lock-out, Boychuk ventured to Europe and signed a temporary contract in Austria with EC Red Bull Salzburg of the EBEL on November 16, 2012. He scored two goals and posted eight points in 15 games before he returned to the Bruins for the shortened 2012–13 season.

On October 4, 2014, due to salary cap constraints, Boychuk was traded to the New York Islanders in exchange for two second-round draft picks in the 2015  (previously acquired from the Philadelphia Flyers, later used to select Brandon Carlo) and 2016 NHL Entry Drafts (used on Ryan Lindgren), as well as a conditional third-rounder in the 2015 Draft (condition was never met). In his Islanders debut, Boychuk scored a goal and two assists against the Carolina Hurricanes. On March 12, 2015, he signed a seven-year, $42 million contract extension with the Islanders, lasting through the 2021–22 season.

On November 25, 2020, the Islanders announced that Boychuk would be retiring due to an eye injury that he suffered in a game against the Montreal Canadiens on March 3, 2020.

In a salary cap move, the Buffalo Sabres acquired Boychuk's remaining contract from the Islanders on November 4, 2021.

Personal life
In the summer of 2011, Boychuk married Sheena Burletoff. The couple have twin daughters and a son. John Quenneville, who was drafted by the New Jersey Devils in the 2014 NHL Entry Draft, is his nephew by marriage.

Career statistics

Regular season and playoffs

International

Awards and honours

References

External links
 

1984 births
Albany River Rats players
Boston Bruins players
Calgary Hitmen players
Canadian ice hockey defencemen
Canadian people of Ukrainian descent
Colorado Avalanche draft picks
Colorado Avalanche players
EC Red Bull Salzburg players
Hershey Bears players
Lake Erie Monsters players
Living people
Lowell Lock Monsters players
Moose Jaw Warriors players
New York Islanders players
Providence Bruins players
Ice hockey people from Edmonton
Stanley Cup champions
Canadian expatriate ice hockey players in Austria
Canadian expatriate ice hockey players in the United States